Podhradí may refer to places in the Czech Republic:

Podhradí (Cheb District), a municipality and village in the Karlovy Vary Region
Podhradí (Jičín District), a market town in the Hradec Králové Region
Podhradí (Zlín District), a municipality and village in the Zlín Region